Heliconius hecale, the tiger longwing, Hecale longwing, golden longwing or golden heliconian, is a heliconiid butterfly that occurs from Mexico to the Peruvian Amazon. Hecale, was an old woman who gave shelter to Theseus on his way to capture the Marathonian Bull.

Subspecies
Listed alphabetically:
H. h. anderida Hewitson, [1853]
H. h. annetta Riffarth, 1900
H. h. australis Brown, 1976
H. h. barcanti Brown, 1976
H. h. clearei Hall, 1930
H. h. discomaculatus Weymer, 1891
H. h. ennius Weymer, 1891
H. h. felix Weymer, 1894
H. h. fornarina Hewitson, [1854]
H. h. hecale (Fabricius, 1775)
H. h. holcophorus Staudinger, [1897]
H. h. humboldti Neustetter, 1928
H. h. ithaca C. & R. Felder, 1862
H. h. latus Riffarth, 1900
H. h. melicerta Bates, 1866
H. h. metellus Weymer, 1894
H. h. naxos Neukirchen, 1998
H. h. nigrofasciatus Weymer, 1894
H. h. novatus Bates, 1867
H. h. paraensis Riffarth, 1900
H. h. paulus Neukirchen, 1998
H. h. quitalena Hewitson, [1853]
H. h. rosalesi Brown & Fernández, 1976
H. h. sisyphus Salvin, 1871
H. h. shanki Lamas & Brown, 1976
H. h. sulphureus Weymer, 1894
H. h. vetustus Butler, 1873
H. h. zeus Neukirchen, 1995
H. h. zuleika Hewitson, 1854

References

hecale
Butterflies described in 1776
Taxa named by Johan Christian Fabricius